is a JR West Geibi Line station located in Mita, Shiraki-chō, Asakita-ku, Hiroshima, Hiroshima Prefecture, Japan.

History
1930-01-01: Shirakiyamaguchi Station opens
1937-07-01: The station is renamed Shirakiyama Station
1987-04-01: Japan National Railways is privatized, and Shirakiyama Station becomes a JR West station

Station building and platforms
Shirakiyama Station features one side platform capable of handling one line. The station is unmanned, and is used as a convenient meeting place for the surrounding area.

Environs
Junkaku-ji (Buddhist temple)
Saifuki-ji (Buddhist temple)
Bettōyama
Shirakiyama trailhead
Misasa River

Highway access
 Hiroshima Prefectural Route 37 (Hiroshima-Miyoshi Route)

Connecting lines
All lines are JR West lines. 
Geibi Line
Commuter Liner/Local
Nakamita Station — Shirakiyama Station — Karuga Station

External links
 JR West

Railway stations in Hiroshima Prefecture
Geibi Line
Stations of West Japan Railway Company in Hiroshima city
Railway stations in Japan opened in 1930